Wolf  is a river of Baden-Württemberg, Germany. The historical name of the river is Wolfach. It passes through Bad Rippoldsau-Schapbach and flows into the Kinzig in Wolfach.

One of its tributaries flows over the Burgbach Waterfall, one of the highest free-falling waterfalls in Germany.

See also
List of rivers of Baden-Württemberg

References 

Rivers of Baden-Württemberg
Rivers of Germany